Pordim Islands (‘Ostrovi Pordim’ 'os-tro-vi 'por-dim) are two adjacent islands situated  east-northeast of Heywood Island and  northwest of Catharina Point on Robert Island, South Shetland Islands. Extending  in east-southeast to west-northwest direction. Bulgarian early mapping in 2009. Named after the town of Pordim in northern Bulgaria.

See also 
 Composite Antarctic Gazetteer
 List of Antarctic islands south of 60° S
 SCAR
 Territorial claims in Antarctica

References

External links
 Pordim Islands. SCAR Composite Antarctic Gazetteer
 Bulgarian Antarctic Gazetteer. Antarctic Place-names Commission. (details in Bulgarian, basic data in English)

External links
 Pordim Islands. Copernix satellite image

Islands of Robert Island
Bulgaria and the Antarctic